Manokin is an unincorporated community in Somerset County, Maryland, United States.  It is located on Maryland Route 361 at the intersection of River Road. The George Maddox Farm, Sudler's Conclusion and Waters' River are listed on the National Register of Historic Places.

See also
 Manokin Historic District

References

Unincorporated communities in Somerset County, Maryland
Unincorporated communities in Maryland